The animals of New Zealand, part of its biota, have an unusual history because, before the arrival of humans, less than 900 years ago, the country was mostly free of mammals, except those that could swim there (seals, sea lions, and, off-shore, whales and dolphins) or fly there (bats), though as recently as the Miocene, it was home to the terrestrial Saint Bathans mammal, implying that mammals had been present since the island had broken away from other landmasses. The absence of mammals meant that all of the ecological niches occupied by mammals elsewhere were occupied instead by either insects or birds, leading to an unusually large number of flightless birds, including the kiwi, the weka, the moa (now extinct), the takahē, and the kakapo.

Because of the lack of predators, even bats spend most of their time on the ground. There are also about 60 species of lizard (30 each of gecko and skink), four species of frog (all rare and endangered), and the tuatara (reptiles resembling lizards but with a distinct lineage).

Some butterflies of New Zealand are endemic, while many species have been introduced and some species of butterflies periodically migrate to New Zealand. The Australian painted lady has been known to migrate from Australia to New Zealand in times of strong migration in Australia.

Invasive species
Humans first arrived via the Pacific islands, in several waves at some time before 1300 AD, bringing with them the Polynesian rat (kiore) and the domesticated dog. Europeans later brought pigs, ferrets, stoats, mice, rats, dogs, cats, sheep, cattle, and many other mammals. Of these, the rats, ferrets, cats, stoats and dogs have all seriously impacted the New Zealand fauna, driving many species to extinction. Brushtail possums were introduced from Australia for a fur industry, and deer from Europe as game animals, both seriously damaging the forest habitat of many birds.

In recent years, successful efforts have been made to remove possums, rats, ferrets, and other mammals from many large and small offshore islands in an effort to return these places to something more closely resembling their pre-human state. An estimated 30 tons of dead possums were removed from Kapiti Island, for example. Similarly, efforts are being made to control such species in selected locations on the mainland. In a further step, in certain mainland reserves mammals are being eliminated within predator-proof fences creating ecological islands. Examples are Zealandia in Wellington city, from which about a ton of dead possums was removed after the installation of a mammal-proof fence, and the Maungatautari Restoration Project.

See also
Fauna
 Birds of New Zealand
 Butterflies of New Zealand
 Crabs of New Zealand
 Frogs of New Zealand
 Geckos of New Zealand
 Mammals of New Zealand
 Non-marine and marine molluscs of New Zealand
 Reptiles of New Zealand
 Spiders of New Zealand
 Stick insects of New Zealand

Other
 Animal welfare in New Zealand
 Biodiversity of New Zealand
 Invasive species in New Zealand
 Flora of New Zealand

References

Further reading

External links

 Native animals at the Department of Conservation
 Fauna of New Zealand  at Landcare Research
 Animals databases  at Landcare Research